The 3rd award ceremony of Premios Feroz was held at the Teatro Príncipe Pío in Madrid, on January 19, 2016. It was hosted by comedian and actress Silvia Abril and aired on Canal+.

Winners and nominees
The nominations were announced on December 9, 2015. Later in December, B, la película was disclosed in advance as the recipient of the Special Award. The winners and nominees are listed as follows:

Honorary Award 
 Honorary Feroz Award: Rosa María Sardá

Special Award 
 Special Award: B, la película

See also
30th Goya Awards

References

2016 film awards
Feroz Awards
2016 in Madrid
January 2016 events in Europe